Menemerus affinis is a jumping spider species in the genus Menemerus that lives in the United Arab Emirates.

References

Salticidae
Invertebrates of the Arabian Peninsula
Spiders of Asia
Spiders described in 2010
Taxa named by Wanda Wesołowska